Martin F. Bartlett (May 4, 1864 – July 18, 1918) was an American politician from Maine. Bartlett, a Republican, served one term as mayor of Waterville, Maine (1915) and two terms in the Maine Senate (1915-1918).

In the March 1915 mayoral election, Bartlett defeated Democrat Edman P. Fish 1,297 to 1,061.

References

1864 births
1918 deaths
Mayors of Waterville, Maine
Republican Party Maine state senators